The Seoul City Wall Museum is a museum in Jongno-5.6 ga Subdistrict, Jongno District, Seoul, South Korea.

History
The museum was opened on 31 July 2014.

Architecture
The museum consists of permanent exhibition hall, temporary exhibition hall, information center and multipurpose lecture room.

Exhibitions
The museum exhibits artifacts related to the history and transformation of Seoul City and the Fortress Wall of Seoul.

Transportation
The museum is accessible within walking distance north of Dongdaemun Station of Seoul Metro.

See also
 List of museums in South Korea

References

City museums
2014 establishments in South Korea
Museums established in 2014
Museums in Seoul